Alopecia is the second studio album by American band Why?. It was released by Anticon on March 11, 2008.

Critical reception
At Metacritic, which assigns a weighted average score out of 100 to reviews from mainstream critics, Alopecia received an average score of 76% based on 21 reviews, indicating "generally favorable reviews".

Pitchfork placed "Fatalist Palmistry" at number 94 on the "100 Best Tracks of 2008" list.

Sampling
"The Fall of Mr. Fifths" samples dialogue spoken by Will Oldham in the film Old Joy.

Track listing

Personnel
Credits adapted from the album's liner notes.

 Yoni Wolf – music, production, mixing, artwork
 Josiah Wolf – music, production, mixing
 Doug McDiarmid – music
 Andrew Broder – music
 Mark Erickson – music
 Doseone – additional contributions
 Jel – additional contributions
 Odd Nosdam – additional contributions
 Nedelle Torrisi – additional contributions
 Paul Flynn – additional contributions
 Liz Hodson – additional contributions
 Andrew McDiarmid – additional contributions
 Deborah Ranker – additional contributions
 Jeremy Ylvisaker – additional contributions
 Dee Kesler – additional contributions, mixing
 Tom Herbers – recording
 Eli Crews – mixing
 Mike Wells – mastering
 Sam Flax Keener – layout

Charts

References

External links
 

2008 albums
Why? (American band) albums
Anticon albums